Richard Brent (1757December 30, 1814) was an American planter, lawyer, and politician who represented Virginia in both the U.S. House and  the U.S. Senate, and at various times Fairfax, Prince William and Stafford counties as he served at various times in both houses of the Virginia General Assembly.

Early and family life
Brent was born in 1757, the eldest son of lawyer and future patriot legislator William Brent (1732-1782), at his father's plantation estate, 'Richland' on the Potomac River in Stafford County in the Colony of Virginia. Nearly a century earlier George Brent had emigrated across the Atlantic Ocean to the Virginia Colony to avoid England's Civil Wars and persecution as a Catholic and established 'Woodstock' plantation; others from that prominent Catholic family would include Margaret Brent, and Eleanor Carroll, sister of the future Archbishop John Carroll, who as a priest in Maryland crossed the Potomac River to serve the Brents and other Catholics in Northern Virginia Privately educated, Brent also read law, but never married.

Career

Admitted to the Virginia bar, Brent had a private legal practice in northern Virginia. Although Virginia had several laws (including one requiring an oath the support the Church of England, which restricted Catholics from practicing law and sitting in the legislature, those were not enforced against him. Before his birth, some relatives moved to Prince William County, Virginia and established Brent Town (modern Brentsville) to avoid such anti-Catholic legislation, although such mostly grew after William Brent's death, first when it became the Prince William County government seat, and later with the development of the Orange and Alexandria Railroad.

After his father's death Brent continued his family tradition and several times won election to the Virginia House of Delegates, representing Stafford County in 1788 and representing Prince William County in 1793, 1794, 1800 and 1801.

In 1794, Brent won election to the United States House of Representatives and represented Virginia's 17th congressional district during the 4th and 5th Congresses, serving from March 1795 to March 1799, when he returned to the Virginia House of Delegates, again winning election from Prince William County. Brent again won election to the U.S. House and served another two-year term during the 7th Congress from March 1801 to March 1803. He served in the Virginia State Senate from 1808 to 1810.

Following his service in the Virginia State Senate, fellow delegates elected Brent to the United States Senate, where he served from March 1809 until his death in Washington, D.C., on December 30, 1814.

He is buried at the private Brent family cemetery near Aquia in Stafford County, Virginia.

See also
List of United States Congress members who died in office (1790–1899)

References

1757 births
1814 deaths
People from Stafford County, Virginia
American people of English descent
Democratic-Republican Party members of the United States House of Representatives from Virginia
Democratic-Republican Party United States senators from Virginia
Virginia lawyers
American planters
18th-century American politicians
19th-century American politicians
19th-century American lawyers